Bipunctiphorus dimorpha is a moth of the family Pterophoridae. The species was first described by Thomas Bainbrigge Fletcher in 1910. It is known from the Seychelles, Sierra Leone, South Africa, Kenya, Réunion, Madagascar and Tanzania. It has also been recorded from China.

The wingspan is about 18 mm.

References

Platyptiliini
Moths of Africa
Moths of Madagascar
Moths of Réunion
Moths of Seychelles
Moths described in 1910